Boreoides is a genus of flies in the family Stratiomyidae.

Species
Boreoides machiliformis (Enderlein, 1921)
Boreoides subulatus Hardy, 1920
Boreoides tasmaniensis Bezzi, 1922

References

Stratiomyidae
Brachycera genera
Diptera of Australasia